Lepadichthys sandaracatus, the Shark Bay clingfish, is a species of clingfish from the family Gobiesocidae. This species is endemic to Western Australia. This species was described in 1943 by Gilbert Percy Whitley with a type locality of Useless Inlet in Shark Bay, Western Australia.

References

Fish described in 1943
sandaracatus